Adelaide Ames (June 3, 1900 – June 26, 1932) was an American astronomer and research assistant at Harvard University. She contributed to the study of galaxies with her co-authorship of A Survey of the External Galaxies Brighter Than the Thirteenth Magnitude, which was later known as the Shapley-Ames catalog. Ames was a member of the American Astronomical Society. She was a contemporary of Cecilia Payne-Gaposchkin and her closest friend at the observatory.

Ames died in a boating accident in 1932, the same year the Shapley-Ames catalog was published. She was interred at the Arlington National Cemetery.

Biography
Ames attended Vassar College until 1922 and then studied at Radcliffe College, where there was a recently created graduate program in astronomy. Ames graduated in 1924 as the first woman with an M.A in astronomy at Radcliffe. Originally she had planned to become a journalist, but she found no work in the area and instead accepted a job as a research assistant at the Harvard College Observatory (HCO), a position she held until her death. The focus of her work was the cataloging of galaxies in the constellations Coma and Virgo. In 1931, the finished catalog included nearly 2800 objects. This work earned her membership in the IAU Commission 28 on Nebulae and Star Clusters.

On June 26, 1932, while vacationing on Squam Lake, Ames was taking a canoe tour with a friend on the lake when the boat capsized. She was presumed to have drowned and her body was found after a ten-day search on July 5, 1932. She died at the age of 32.

Research at Harvard
In 1921, Harlow Shapley became director of HCO, and soon afterward hired Ames as an assistant. Ames was Shapley's first graduate student and Ames went on to supervise her own graduate students.  Her early work at Harvard focused on the identification of NGC/IC objects. In 1926, she and Shapley published several articles on the shapes, colors, and diameters of 103 NGC galaxies. In 1930, she published A catalog of 2778 nebulae including the Coma-Virgo group, which identified 214 NGC and 342 IC objects in the area of the Virgo cluster.

Shapley-Ames Catalog
During her tenure at the Harvard College Observatory, she worked together with Harlow Shapley on the Shapley-Ames catalog, which lists galaxies beyond the 13th magnitude. From their observations of approximately 1250 galaxies, they found evidence of clustering near the north pole of the Milky Way that differs from the south pole. These results were significant because their finding of "general unevenness in distribution" of galaxies deviated from the assumption of isotropy.

Family 
Adelaide Ames's father was T.L. Ames, who served as a colonel in the U.S. Army.

See also
 Supercluster

References

External links
 Adelaide Ames Publications in Astrophysics Data System
 Astronomy Compendium
 AIP History Newsletter

1900 births
1932 deaths
American women astronomers
Accidental deaths in New Hampshire
Boating accident deaths
20th-century American women scientists
20th-century American scientists
Radcliffe College alumni
Vassar College alumni
Harvard College Observatory people